Khwaja Mohammed Shahid is an Indian career civil servant, academic and administrator who formerly served as Vice Chancellor of Maulana Azad National Urdu University and Registrar of Jamia Millia Islamia University. He was also an eminent visitor to the University Grants Commission.

He also previously served as Joint Secretary to Government of India. He is a Central Secretariat Service officer.

Early life and education
He graduated with Bachelor, Masters and a Doctor of Philosophy from Aligarh Muslim University.

Career

Civil service
Shahid joined the Central Secretariat Service after qualifying through the Civil Services Examination. He served as Joint Secretary in Union Public Service Commission Secretariat.

He was later empanelled and served in the post as Joint Secretary to Government of India. He was appointed as Director of Institute of Secretariat Training and Management by the Ministry of Personnel, Public Grievances and Pensions.

Academic
He served as Registrar of Jamia Millia Islamia University and was responsible for transforming the institution from a "deemed university" status to a full-fledged central university.

He was later appointed as Pro-Vice Chancellor of Maulana Azad National Urdu University by the Ministry of Human Resource Development. He was later appointed as  Vice Chancellor (Incharge) of Maulana Azad National Urdu University.

Books, research papers and journals
Shahid is the author of 3 Urdu and 1 English book.

Books
 Indian Higher Education at a Crossroads (Publisher: Kalpaz Publications)

References

External links

Khwaja Shahid moots the idea of caravan of goodwill and harmony The Siasat Daily
 MANUU's new VC assures justice as campus protests continue Sakshi Post (2015)
 Muslim educational institutes celebrate Independence Day with gaiety Muslim Mirror
 Maulana Azad National Urdu University row: Professors lodge complaint Deccan Chronicle
 President Message, AMU Aligarh Muslim University

Living people
Aligarh Muslim University alumni
Indian civil servants
Indian government officials
Central Secretariat Service officers
Indian scholars
21st-century Indian scholars
Indian academic administrators
Indian Muslims
Year of birth missing (living people)